Mr. Fathead is an album by saxophonist David Newman recorded in 1977 and released on the Warner Bros label.

Reception

In his review for AllMusic, Alex Henderson stated: "Newman showed a lot of R&B fans that improvisatory horn solos weren't something to be afraid of. Improvisation, however, isn't something that you will hear a lot of on 1976's disappointing Mr. Fathead ... For the most part, this erratic and unfocused LP isn't soul-jazz, most of the material is either disco-funk or lightweight instrumental pop. ... for the most part, Mr. Fathead wastes Newman's considerable talents. This record is strictly for completists".

Track listing 
 "Dance With Me" (John Hall, Johanna Hall) – 3:54	
 "Groovin' to the Music" (Gregory P. Coverdale, Diane Cameron, Deborah McGriff) – 5:51
 "You Got Style" (Ralph MacDonald, William Salter) – 4:33
 "Ebo Man" (David Newman, Arthur Jenkins) – 5:31
 "Shiki" (Bill Fischer) – 4:01
 "Promise Me Your Love" (MacDonald, Salter) – 4:34
 "I Love Music" (Kenny Gamble, Leon Huff) – 6:14
 "Mashooganah" (Newman) – 5:09

Personnel 
David Newman – tenor saxophone, alto saxophone, soprano saxophone, flute
Bill Fischer – electric piano, synthesizer, arranger (tracks 1-3, 5, 7 & 8)
Arthur Jenkins – piano, keyboards, arranger, conductor (tracks 1, 4, 6 & 8) 
Pat Rebillot – clavinet (tracks 1-3, 7 & 8)
Jose Cruz – piano, electric piano (tracks 2, 3 & 5)
Ben Lanzarrone – electric piano (track 7)
Jim Bossy (tracks 2, 3 & 5), Burt Collins (tracks 4 & 6), Joseph Shepley (tracks 4 & 6) – trumpet 
Buddy Morrow – trombone (tracks 4 & 6)
Jonathan Dorn – tuba (tracks 1, 4, 6 & 8)
Billy Slapin – clarinet, piccolo (tracks 4 & 6)
Richard Landry (tracks 2, 3 & 5) Richard Peck (track 5) – tenor saxophone
Luis Cruz (tracks 2, 3 & 5), Jerry Friedman (tracks 4 & 7), Keith Loving (track 4) – guitar 
Ron Carter (tracks 1, 7 & 8), Bill Salter (tracks 4 & 6)  – bass 
Anthony Jackson – bass guitar (tracks 2, 3 & 5)
Nathaniel Gibbs (track 5), Jimmy Johnson (tracks 1, 7 & 8), Andy Newmark (tracks 4, & 6), Jimmie Young (tracks 2 & 3)  – drums
Ralph MacDonald (track 4), John Rodrieguez (track 4), Dom Um Romão (tracks 1, 5, 7 & 8), David Valentin (tracks 2, 3 & 5) – percussion 
David Carey – vibraphone, chimes tambourine (tracks 4 & 6)
Patti Austin (tracks 4 & 6), Benjamin Carter (tracks 3 & 7), Diane Cameron (track 2), William Eaton (track 4), Yvonne Fletcher (tracks 3 & 7), Frank Floyd (tracks 4 & 6) Denise Flythe (track 2), Deborah McDuffie (tracks 4 & 6), Deborah McGriff (track 2), Bessye Ruth Scott (tracks 3 & 7)  – backing vocals
Gregory P. Coverdale – vocal arranger (track 2)
String section: (track 7)
Ariana Bronne, Elliot Rosoff, Eugene Moye, Gene Orloff, Guy Lumia, Harold Kohon, Harry Zaratzian, Julien Barber, Kathryn Kienke, Marie Hence, Norman Carr, Sanford Allen, Thomas Kornacker, Tony Posk, Warren Laffredo, Yoko Matsuo - violin
Selwart Clarke - viola

References 

David "Fathead" Newman albums
1976 albums
Warner Records albums
Albums produced by Joel Dorn
Albums arranged by William S. Fischer